Josephine Drivinski Hunsinger (October 28, 1914 – October 5, 2010) was a representative for the 1st district of the Michigan House of Representatives from January 1, 1973 to December 31, 1976.

Personal life
Josephine Drivinski Hunsinger (née Srivinski) was born on October 28, 1914 to Joseph Drzewienski and Catherine Moskal in Acosta, Somerset, Pennsylvania. She is the 2nd oldest child of 6. She has an older sister named Pauline Drivinski (1911-1985), 1 younger sister named Veronica Drivinski (1921-1983), and 3 younger brothers named John (1916-1988), Stanley (1918-2009), and Edward Drivinski(1923-1995).

She married Raymond L. Hunsinger and had 1 daughter named Irene K. Hunsinger (1931-).

References

1914 births
2010 deaths
Women state legislators in Michigan
Members of the Michigan House of Representatives
20th-century American women politicians
20th-century American politicians
21st-century American women